Aristo (from ) may refer to:

People

Given name
 Aristo of Ceos (3rd century BC), Peripatetic philosopher
 Aristo of Chios (3rd century BC), Stoic philosopher and colleague of Zeno of Citium 
 Aristo of Alexandria (1st century BC), Peripatetic philosopher
 Aristo of Pella (2nd century AD), Jewish Christian writer
 Aristo Sham (born 1996), classical pianist born in Hong Kong

Surname
 Salman Aristo (born 1976), Indonesian screenwriter and film director

Other uses 
 Aristo (play), a 2008 play by Martin Sherman
 Aristo (ruler), a member of the ruling class of Eubians society in Saga of the Skolian Empire
 OZ Aristo, wheels that come on some versions of the Volkswagen Golf; see Volkswagen Golf Mk4
 Toyota Aristo, sold as the Lexus GS, outside the Japanese domestic market
 Aristo, tutor of the four characters from Caroline Lawrence's "The Roman Mysteries"
 Aristo, ancient Greek for "the best", an epithet of the goddess Artemis at Athens.

See also
 Ariston (disambiguation)
 Aristotle (disambiguation)